Camp Babbitt was an American Civil War Union Army camp located in two sites in the vicinity of Visalia, California.

History
The first site of Camp Babbitt, established on June 24, 1862, was located one mile northeast of the center of the town of Visalia, in Tulare County.   It was first garrisoned by two companies of the 2nd California Cavalry.  The post was named for Lieutenant Colonel E. B. Babbitt, Quartermaster General of the Department of the Pacific.

Visalia Secessionist Disturbances 
The post was first intended to maintain order in the area where strong pro Confederate sentiments were creating unrest.  In an attempt to control subversion of the Union cause in the secessionist hotbed of Visalia, on the orders of General George Wright, Captain Moses A. McLaughlin moved his company D and another in October 1862 over the Sierra Nevada Mountains from the Owens Valley in four and a half days to take command of Camp Babbitt.  On December 12, three men from Visalia rode in front of a dress parade of the garrison and cheered for Jeff Davis, prompting McLaughlin to order their immediate arrest.  On December 24, 1862, McLaughlin wrote for reinforcements, in the face of rising tensions between the Union and Secesh factions. 
 
On December 31, McLaughlin issued orders for the arrest of the owners and publishers of the "Expositor", the local secessionist newspaper.  That same day he was instructed by headquarters by telegram to release all political prisoners after they had taken the oath of allegiance. Both owners eventually swore the oath, one after a time in the jail.  However this did not stop them from continuing to publish their paper opposing the war and the Union cause.

Owens Valley Indian War
By April 12, 1863, Lt. Col. William Jones, was commander at Camp Babbitt, ordered Captain McLaughlin to reinforce Camp Independence with a detachment of 24 men of Company D and 18 men of Company E, 2nd Cavalry, California Volunteers, with a 12-pounder howitzer, and four six-mule government wagon teams, carrying rations, ammunition, and forage.  Elements of Company D and Company E under Captain McLaughlin, on the resumption of hostilities in the Owens Valley marched there in April 1863 via Keyesville, where they engaged in the Keyesville Massacre.  They then moved on to Camp Independence, in the Owens River Valley, participating in the final campaign of the Owens Valley Indian War, and escorted almost 1000 Paiute to Fort Tejon in July 1863.

Mason Henry Gang
On February 18, 1865, Captain Herman Noble sent a detachment of Company E, 2nd California Cavalry, under Sergeant Rowley, from Camp Babbitt near Visalia in a long pursuit of men believed to be the Mason Henry Gang.  It took them across the deserts of Southern California, south to Sonora, Mexico. The March 15, 1865, issue of The Visalia Delta described the pursuit: 
 
 MASON AND HENRY - The squad of soldiers sent out from Camp Babbitt by Captain Noble under the command of Sergeant Rowley, in pursuit of the above Constitutional Democratic murders of Union men, have returned to camp. They report a very hard skirmish, traveling over 900 miles through a most desolate country; upon several occasions going out two or three days without food for themselves, or forage for their horses. They were several times on their trail, after they left Fort Tejón, and finally tracked them down into Sonora, when they were compelled to give up the chase on account of their horses giving out and their inability to get fresh ones. The fugitives were well supplied with gold, having $3,000 or more in their possession. It is believed by many that they have gone to recruit a guerrilla band, and will return to prey on Union men in the lower part of the State. They could have obtained plenty of recruits nigher  home. Doubtless, Visalia would have furnished several birds of prey and a surgeon or two, to bind up their broken bones, and very likely a Chaplain to minister to their bruised souls, and a number of spies, sneaks, and informers. As to good fighting men, they would be scarcer hereabouts. The party were out twenty-five days.

After the Civil War
After the end of the Civil War, on October 2. 1865, the post was relocated about a mile northeast of its first site. Various dates have been given for its abandonment, from late in 1865 to August 19, 1866."

The sites today
The original site was near Race and Santa Fe Streets. 
The second site was in the vicinity of Ben Maddox Way and Houston Avenue.

References

Camp Babbitt
History of Tulare County, California
San Joaquin Valley
Closed installations of the United States Army
California in the American Civil War
American Civil War army posts
Camp Babbitt
1862 establishments in California